Ruin Arch is a little visited archaeological site in the San Rafael Swell of south-central Utah, which features some ancient Fremont culture artwork. To the left of the arch is an Indian Kiva. The arch is one of the features of the Ruin Arch area, across from the arch is more rock art and kivas.

References 
 The River

Fremont culture
Tourist attractions in Emery County, Utah